Katpar is a census town in Bhavnagar district in the Indian state of Gujarat.

Demographics
 India census, Katpar had a population of 7043. Males constitute 50% of the population and females 50%. Katpar has an average literacy rate of 34%, lower than the national average of 59.5%: male literacy is 50%, and female literacy is 18%. In Katpar, 21% of the population is under 6 years of age.

References

Villages in Bhavnagar district